Jatun Q'asa (Quechua jatun, hatun big, q'asa mountain pass, "big pass", also spelled Jatun Khasa) is a mountain in the Bolivian Andes which reaches a height of approximately . It is located in the Chuquisaca Department, Jaime Zudáñez Province, Icla Municipality. Jatun Q'asa lies between the Lampasar River and the Warmi Wañusqa River, southwest of Chullunkhäni.

References 

Mountains of Chuquisaca Department